Bichchade Balam is an Indian film directed by Manibhai Vyas  released in 1948. The film starring Meena Kumari, A.R. Ojha, Mohammed Farooqui, Mohantara Talpade, Savitri Gidwani.

Meena Kumari also lent her voice for playback and sung six songs in this film.

Soundtrack

References

External links
 

1947 films
1940s Hindi-language films
Indian black-and-white films